Gonospermum is a genus of flowering plants in the sunflower family.

 Species
All the species are endemic to the Canary Islands.
 Gonospermum canariense (DC.) Less. 
 Gonospermum ferulaceum (Webb & Berthel.) Febles 
 Gonospermum fruticosum (Buch) Less.
 Gonospermum gomerae Bolle
 Gonospermum revolutum (C.Sm. ex Buch) Sch.Bip.
 Gonospermum oshanahanii (Marrero Rodr., Febles & Suárez) Febles
 Gonospermum ptarmiciflorum (Webb) Febles

References

Anthemideae
Asteraceae genera
Flora of the Canary Islands